Juliana Kaduya (born 1979) is a Malawian politician and teacher who was the first female mayor of Lilongwe City Council, Malawi. Kaduya served in this position between 2019 and 2021.

Background and education 
Kaduya was born in 1979 and raised by her elder sister after both her parents passed on. After her formal education, she obtained a Diploma in Teaching having studied at Domasi Teachers College.

Career 
Kaduya worked as a teacher for 15 years before she joined active politics 

In 2014, Kaduya contested for Councillor for Chilinde 1 Ward,Lilongwe City South Constituency, on the Democratic Progressive Party (DPP) ticket. As a Councillor in 2017, she was then elected Deputy Mayor of Lilongwe City Council. After being elected deputy mayor, she joined the Malawi Congress Party (MCP). In 2019, She was re-elected Councillor on the Malawi Congress Party ticket and was then elected as Mayor of Lilongwe City by her fellow Councillors (27) and Members of Parliament (4).

Personal life 
Kaduya is a mother of four.

References 

Living people
1979 births
Mayors of places in Malawi
Malawian women in politics